Saadi Yacef (20 January 1928 – 10 September 2021) was an Algerian independence fighter, serving as a leader of the National Liberation Front during his country's war of independence. He was a Senator in Algeria's Council of the Nation until his death.

Biography
Yacef was born in Algiers. The son of parents from the Algerian region of Kabylia, he started his working life as an apprentice baker. In 1945, he joined the Parti du Peuple Algérien, a nationalist party which the French authorities soon outlawed, after which it was reconstituted as the Mouvement pour le Triomphe des Libertes Democratiques (MTLD). From 1947 to 1949, Yacef served in the MTLD's paramilitary wing, the Organisation Secrete. After the OS was broken up, Yacef moved to France and lived there until 1952, when he returned to Algeria to work again as a baker.

Yacef joined the FLN at the start of the Algerian War in 1954. By May 1956, he was the FLN's military chief of the Zone Autonome d'Alger (Autonomous Zone of Algiers), making him one of the leaders on the Algerian side in the Battle of Algiers. He was captured by French troops on 24 September 1957 and eventually sentenced to death. General Paul Aussaresses later asserted that while in custody, Yacef betrayed the FLN and the Algerian cause by providing the French army with the location of Ali la Pointe, another leading FLN commander. Yacef denied it, and historian Darius Rejali considers the accusation as highly suspect. He was ultimately pardoned by the French government after Charles de Gaulle's 1958 return to power.

Yacef claimed to have written his memoirs of the battle in prison  The writings were published in 1962 as Souvenirs de la Bataille d'Alger. After the Algerian War, Yacef helped produce Italian filmmaker Gillo Pontecorvo's film The Battle of Algiers (1966), based on Souvenirs de la Bataille d'Alger. Yacef played a character modeled on his own experiences in the battle.

Yacef died on 10 September 2021, aged 93, in Algiers. His daughter Zaphira Yacef stated that he had been suffering from heart problems before his death.

See also
 Zohra Drif

References

1928 births
2021 deaths
People from Algiers
Members of the Council of the Nation
Bakers
Algerian guerrillas
Movement for the Triumph of Democratic Liberties politicians
Algerian People's Party politicians
National Liberation Front (Algeria) politicians
Algerian prisoners sentenced to death
Prisoners sentenced to death by France
21st-century Algerian people
Recipients of French presidential pardons